A partial solar eclipse occurred on October 7, 1801. The eclipse was visible in New Zealand and Antarctica.

See also 
 List of solar eclipses in the 19th century

References

External links 
 Google interactive maps
 Solar eclipse data

1801 10 07
1801 in science
1801 10 07
October 1801 events